The 1933 Coupe de France Final was a football match held at Stade Olympique Yves-du-Manoir, Colombes on May 7, 1933, that saw Excelsior AC Roubaix defeat RC Roubaix 3–1 thanks to goals by Marcel Langillier, Julien Bugé and Norbert Van Caeneghem.

Match details

See also
Coupe de France 1932-1933

External links
Coupe de France results at Rec.Sport.Soccer Statistics Foundation
Report on French federation site

Coupe
1933
Sport in Hauts-de-Seine
Coupe de France Final
Coupe de France Final